is a Japanese actress and former ballet dancer. In 1997 her portrayal of Mai Kishikawa in Shall We Dance? won a Japan Academy Prize for Outstanding Performance by an Actress in a Leading Role.

Biography
From Toshima, Tokyo, Kusakari started dancing professionally at the age of eight and won the first prize at the Japan Ballet Competition of 1987. In 1987, she made her debut as Odette in Swan Lake. She received the Muramatsu Award in 1988, and the Tachibana Akiko Award in 1990. At 27, she suffered a hernia that nearly ended her career, leaving her a temporary wheelchair user. She retired from ballet in 2009 at the age of 43.

Kusakari is also known for her starring role in Shall We Dance? During the production of the movie she met and later married the director, Masayuki Suo.

She starred in Suo's 2012 film A Terminal Trust.

Recognition 
 1996 20th Japan Academy Prize, Outstanding Performance by an Actress in a Leading Role

Filmography

Films
 Shall We Dance? (1996), Mai Kishikawa
 Dancing Chaplin (2010)
 A Terminal Trust (2012)
 Lady Maiko (2014)
 Moon and Lightning (2017)
 Talking the Pictures (2019), Marguerite (Alla Nazimova)

Television
 Shinzanmono (2010)
 Ryōmaden (2010)
 Diplomat Kosaku Kuroda (2011)
 Shizumanu Taiyō (2016)
 Tokyo Sentimental (2016)
 Kuroido Goroshi (2018), Mitsuru Kuroido
  (2018)

References

External links
 
 

Japanese ballerinas
Japanese film actresses
People from Tokyo
1965 births
Living people